Valli D. Geiger is an American politician and nurse serving as a member of the Maine House of Representatives from the 93rd district. Elected in November 2020, she assumed office on December 2, 2020.

Early life and education 
Geiger was born on the Chanute Air Force Base in Champaign County, Illinois. She earned a Bachelor of Science degree in nursing from Niagara University in 1977 and studied public administration and public health at the University of Massachusetts Amherst. She earned a certification in sustainable development from the Fielding Graduate Institute and earned a Master of Science in sustainable design from the Boston Architectural College in 2014.

Career 
After earning her bachelor's degree, Geiger worked as a nurse at the Pen Bay Medical Center in Rockport, Maine. She was the director of quality improvement at the Maine Primary Care Association and director the Health Reach's Hospice Program. She also owned V Consulting. Geiger previously served on the Rockland City Council and as mayor of Rockland. She was elected to the Maine House of Representatives in November 2020 and assumed office on December 2, 2020. Geiger continues to work part-time as a nurse, first for the Togus VA Medical Center and later for LincolnHealth.

Personal life 
Geiger is married to Greg Marley, the director of suicide prevention at the National Alliance on Mental Illness. Geiger and Marley have one son.

References 

Year of birth missing (living people)
Living people
People from Champaign County, Illinois
Niagara University alumni
American nurses
Nurses from Maine
Boston Architectural College alumni
Democratic Party members of the Maine House of Representatives
Women state legislators in Maine
People from Rockland, Maine